Jane Wood (born 20 March 1968) is a British former professional tennis player.

Wood, a native of Enfield, competed on the professional tour in the 1980s and 1990s. She featured in the singles main draw of the 1987 Wimbledon Championships. Her career included a stint playing collegiate tennis in the United States for Oklahoma State University, where she achieved All-American honours for doubles in 1988.

ITF finals

Singles: 2 (1–1)

Doubles: 10 (7–3)

References

External links
 
 

1968 births
Living people
British female tennis players
English female tennis players
Tennis people from Greater London
Oklahoma State Cowgirls tennis players